Marcus Daniell and Horia Tecău were the defending champions, but they don't participate together this year.
Daniell partnered with Artem Sitak, but they were eliminated in the first round, by František Čermák and Christopher Kas.
Tecău played alongside Robert Lindstedt. However, they withdrew from the tournament before their first round match, against Jose Statham and Mikal Statham.
2nd seeds Marcel Granollers and Tommy Robredo won this tournament. Spanish pair defeated Johan Brunström and Stephen Huss 6–4, 7–6(8–6) in the final.

Seeds

Draw

Draw

References
 Main Draw

2011 Heineken Open
Heineken Open - Doubles